Bahal may refer to:

 Bahal, Cambodia
 Bahal, India
 Bahal, Indonesia, a village in North Sumatra, Indonesia
 Bahal temple, an 11th-century Buddhist temple in Bahal, Indonesia
 Bahal, Iran
 Bahal, Nepal, a type of courtyard
 Seniehun or Bahal, Sierra Leone
 Te Bahal, the largest bahal (courtyard) in Kathmandu, Nepal
 Bahal, an alcoholic drink that is a precursor to the bahalina palm wine of the Philippines